Evanturel is a township in Ontario, Canada.

Évanturel may refer to:

 Alfred Évanturel (1846-1908), Canadian politician
 Eudore Évanturel (1852–1919), Canadian poet
 François Évanturel (1821-1891), Canadian lawyer and politician
 Gustave Évanturel (1879-1934), Canadian notary and politician
 Évanturel Lake, a body of water in Lac-Pikauba, Quebec, Canada